Dharmesh Patel  is an Indian professional footballer who plays as a defender for ONGC in the MDFA Elite Division.
Dharmesh Patel is the first player from Gujarat to play in the  I-League. Also he's the Only player from Gujarat to captain an I-league team ONGC FC from the year 2010 -11. Also he's the only player from Gujarat to play in the I-league & 2nd Div I-league for as long as 7 years from 2006-07 To 2013.

He is the only player from Gujarat who played final round of Federation cup & IFA Shield & Runners-up in Durand Cup which is a great achievement itself. He's also captained Gujarat team at junior and senior level national games. He is also Selected for U-19 National Team.

Career
Dharmesh Patel is the first I-League player from the state of Gujarat. He made his professional debut in the league on 11 October 2010 for ONGC against Dempo SC.

Career statistics

References

Living people
Indian footballers
ONGC FC players
Association football defenders
Footballers from Gujarat
I-League players
Year of birth missing (living people)